Custance was an electoral district of the House of Assembly in the Australian state of South Australia from 1985 to 1997. Until the 1991 electoral redistribution, the district stretched from just outside Port Pirie in the north to the Barossa Valley in the south.

John Olsen moved from the abolished Rocky River to Custance at the 1985 election.

Custance was abolished and replaced by Schubert at the 1997 election.

The Barossa Valley area was first represented by the seat of Barossa.

Members for Custance

Election results

See also
 1990 Custance state by-election

External links
1985 & 1989 election boundaries, page 18 & 19

Former electoral districts of South Australia
1985 establishments in Australia
1997 disestablishments in Australia